The Social Democratic Labour Youth Union was a youth organization in interbellum Romania and the youth of the Social Democratic Party of Romania. As of 1947, the organization had nearly 100,000 members.

References

Youth wings of political parties in Romania
Youth wings of social democratic parties